Russia competed at the 2012 Summer Paralympics in London, United Kingdom, from 29 August to 9 September 2012. A total of 182 athletes were sent by the Russian Paralympic Committee to compete in twelve disciplines: athletics, archery, cycling, swimming, wheelchair fencing, table tennis, powerlifting, shooting, rowing, judo, 7-aside football and sitting volleyball.

Medalists

| width=75% align=left valign=top |

* – Indicates the athlete competed in preliminaries but not the final.

| width=25% align=left valign=top |

Archery

Men

|-
|Alexey Shcherbakov
|Ind. compound Open
|align="center"|631
|align="center"|20
|align="center"|L 4-6
|align="center" colspan=5|Did not advance
|-
|align=left|Mikhail Oyun
|align=left rowspan=3|Ind. recurve Standing
|633
|3
|
|W 7-1
|W 6-2
|L 2-6
|W 6-0
|
|-
|align=left|Oleg Shestakov
|603
|11
|W 6-0
|W 6-4
|W 6-4
|W 6-2
|L 3-7
|
|-
|align=left|Timur Tuchinov
|638
|2
|
|W 6-4
|W 6-0
|W 6-2
|W 7-3
|
|-
|align=left|Mikhail OyunOleg ShestakovTimur Tuchinov
|align=left|Team recurve Open
|1869
|2
|
|
|W 212-199
|W 214-207
|W 206-200
|
|}

Women

|-
|align=left|Stepanida Artakhinova
|align=left rowspan=3|Ind. compound Open
|672
|2
|
|
|W 6-0
|L 0-6
|W 7-3
|
|-
|align=left|Marina Lyzhnikova
|647
|4
|
|
|W 6-0
|L 2-6
|L 3-7
|4
|-
|align=left|Olga Polegaeva
|631
|10
|
|W 6-4
|L 0-6
|colspan=3|Did not advance
|-
|align=left|Irina Batorova
|align=left|Ind. recurve Standing
|517
|10
|
|W 6-4
|L 4-6
|colspan=3|Did not advance
|}

Athletics

Men
Track events

Field events

Women
Track events

Field events

Cycling

Road

Track

Football 7-a-side

Group play

Semifinals

Gold medal match

Judo

Men

Women

Powerlifting

Men

Women

Rowing

Shooting

Swimming

Men

Women

Table tennis

Men

Women

Volleyball

Men's tournament
Overview

Roster

Group play

Quarterfinals

Semifinals

Bronze medal match

Wheelchair fencing

Individual

Teams

See also
2012 Summer Paralympics
Russia at the Paralympics
Russia at the 2012 Summer Olympics

References

External links
Russian Paralympic Committee

Nations at the 2012 Summer Paralympics
2012
Paralympics